Inal is a village and rural commune in Mauritania, situated on the Mauritania Railway line from Nouadhibou to Zouerate.

On the night of November 27, 1990, twenty-eight black soldiers arrested in the previous weeks were tortured, hung and buried in a mass grave at Inal, in a celebratory act of the nation's independence day. Similar acts of ethnic cleansing were sanctioned by the Mauritanian government, as part of a larger campaign of terror and human rights abuses against black Mauritanians, from the late 1980s to the early 1990s. Many black survivors of such violence who live in the area of Inan and other affected communities still demand justice for the event.

References

External links 

 "Black Memories" (Documentary, Ousmane Diagana) - YouTube

Communes of Mauritania